Teppan may refer to:

 The metal griddle used in the teppanyaki style of Japanese cuisine
 Teppan (TV series), a Japanese television drama from 2010–2011